The twenty-eighth season of the animated television series The Simpsons began airing on Fox in the United States on September 25, 2016, and ended on May 21, 2017. On May 4, 2015, Fox announced that The Simpsons had been renewed for season 28.

This season includes the 600th episode of the show, "Treehouse of Horror XXVII".  On August 31, 2016, it was announced that an episode titled "The Caper Chase", inspired by Trump University, would air sometime in 2017; the episode aired on April 2.

This season also includes the show's first hour-long episode, "The Great Phatsby", a parody of The Great Gatsby. Other noteworthy events and gags include a Pokémon Go-themed episode ("Looking for Mr. Goodbart"), couch gags spoofing Robot Chicken and Adventure Time, an episode that shows how Homer learned to feel better with food ("Fatzcarraldo"), Mr. Burns hiring all of the Simpsons (except Homer) to become his "pretend" family ("Friends and Family"), and Glenn Close returning as Mona ("Fatzcarraldo").

This was the final season scored by longtime Simpsons composer Alf Clausen. This also marked the first season where former recurring guest star Kevin Michael Richardson joined the regular supporting cast, starting with the episode "The Last Traction Hero".

Episodes

References

Simpsons season 28
2016 American television seasons
2017 American television seasons